Nobody's Fool(s) may refer to:

Film, television and fiction
 Nobody's Fool (1921 film), a silent film starring Marie Prevost
 Nobody's Fool (1936 film), a film starring Glenda Farrell
 Nobody's Fool (1986 film), a film starring Rosanna Arquette and Eric Roberts
 Nobody's Fool (1994 film), a film starring Paul Newman
 Nobody's Fool (2018 film), a film starring Tiffany Haddish and Tika Sumpter
 Nobody's Fool (novel), a novel by Richard Russo, basis for the 1994 film
 "Nobody's Fool", an episode of the 2003 TV series Teenage Mutant Ninja Turtles

Music

Albums
 Nobody's Fool, a 1973 album, and title song, by Dan Penn
 Nobody's Fool, an unreleased album by Edwin "Lil' Eddie" Serrano
 Nobody's Fool, an album by Norman Wisdom
 Nobody's Fool, a 2022 album by Joanne Shaw Taylor

Songs
 "Nobody's Fool", a charting single by Jim Reeves, 1970 (see Jim Reeves discography)
 "Nobody's Fool" (Slade song), 1976
 "Nobody's Fool" (Cinderella song), 1986
 "Nobody's Fool" (Kenny Loggins song), theme from the 1988 film Caddyshack II
 "Nobody's  Fool" (Haircut One Hundred song), 1982
 "Nobody's Fool" (Richie Furay song) from the Poco album, Pickin' Up the Pieces
 "Nobody's Fool", a song by Avril Lavigne from Let Go
 "Nobody's Fool", a song by Blackhawk from Love & Gravity

See also
 Nobody's Fools, a 1976 album by Slade